The Battle of Wuyuan (March 16 – April 3, 1940) was a Chinese counterattack that defeated the Japanese invasion of the Wuyuan area. This happened in reaction to the Chinese 1939-40 Winter Offensive in Suiyuan during the Second Sino-Japanese War.  The Japanese call it 第２次後套作戦 ("The Second Battle of Wuyuan").

By the 28th of January 1940 the Japanese had built up forces from the 26th Division at Baotou sufficient to launch the 第１次後套作戦 or "First battle of Wuyuan in Inner Mongolia" to recover lost territory and move west to take Wuyuan which fell on February 3 and Linhe further west on the 4th of February.

Units
Japanese Forces:

Mongolia Garrison Army 駐蒙軍 - Naosaburo Okabe
 26th Division - Lt. Gen. Shigenori Kuroda
 IJA Cavalry Group

Chinese Forces:

8th War Area - Deputy Commander Fu Zuoyi
 35th Corps - Fu Zuoyi
 New 4th Division
 New 31st Division
 11th Provisional Division
 Garrison Brigade
 81st Corps - Ma Hongbin
 101st Division
 6th Cavalry Corps - Ma Buqing
 3rd Cavalry Division
 Guerrilla Force

Course of the battle
On March 16, 1940 as the Japanese were attacking the New 4th Division west of Linhe, the rest of the Chinese 35th Corps with the New 31st Division and a regiment of the Garrison Brigade, secretly moved east along the Wu-chia River. On the night of the 20th they entered Wuyuan by surprise and after a seesaw fight over the strongpoint captured the city at 1600 hours on the 21st. The Japanese garrison retreated northward. Chinese forces then moved on to capture a strongpoint around Hsin-an-chen on the 22nd. This cut the road along the Yellow River to Wuyuan.

For three days they fought the 101st Division without success. By the 25th they had been reinforced to 3,000 men and made the crossing with artillery and air support. Wuyuan again fell to the Japanese on the 26th and the Chinese fell back to the banks of Fang-chi-chu and continued their attacks at Xin'an, Xishanzui, Xixiaozhao, and Man-ko-su.

The Middlesboro Daily News which reported on Japan's planned offensive into the Muslim region, predicted that the Japanese would suffer a massive crushing defeat at the hands of the Muslims.

Muslim Generals Ma Hongkui and Ma Hongbin defended west Suiyuan, especially Wuyuan in 1940 against the Japanese. Ma Hongbin commanded the Muslim 81st corps and incurred heavy casualties, but after fierce fighting eventually repulsed the Japanese and defeated them. 

Unable to withstand the pressure of Chinese attacks, the Japanese at Wuyuan retreated on March 30 and 31. On April 1 a guerrilla force and cavalry column recaptured Wuyuan, and the 11th Provisional Division recaptured Wu-pu-lang-kou. On April 3, cavalry recovered Xishanzui as the Japanese retreated to the east.

Japan used poison gas against the Chinese armies at the Battle of Wuyuan and Battle of West Suiyuan.

Sources

 Hsu Long-hsuen and Chang Ming-kai, History of The Sino-Japanese War (1937–1945) 2nd ed., 1971. Translated by Wen Ha-hsiung, Chung Wu Publishing; 33, 140th Lane, Tung-hwa Street, Taipei, Taiwan Republic of China. p. 319-334, "Chinese Winter Offensive" (Late Nov 1939 - Late March 1940) Map 19.

External links

 Maps of Wuyuan battle area during World War II Wu-Yuan nk49-7,  Hsi-Nao-Pao nk49-10

Conflicts in 1940
Wuyuan
1940 in China
1940 in Japan
History of Inner Mongolia
March 1940 events
April 1940 events